Oreidis Despaigne Terry (born 20 September 1981) is a male judoka from Cuba, winner of the Pan American Games men's half heavyweight division at the 2007 Games, he also won the bronze medal at the 2003 Pan American Games and at the 2007 and 2010 World Championships.

He represented his native country at the 2004 Summer Olympics in Athens, Greece. At the 2008 Summer Olympics he reached the 3rd round, losing to Jang Sungho. At the 2012 Summer Olympics he again reached the 3rd round, losing to Ramziddin Sayidov.

His older brother Yosvany Despaigne (born 1976) also competed as a judoka on the international level.

References

External links
 
 

1981 births
Living people
Judoka at the 2004 Summer Olympics
Judoka at the 2008 Summer Olympics
Judoka at the 2012 Summer Olympics
Olympic judoka of Cuba
Judoka at the 2003 Pan American Games
Judoka at the 2007 Pan American Games
Judoka at the 2011 Pan American Games
Cuban male judoka
Pan American Games gold medalists for Cuba
Pan American Games bronze medalists for Cuba
Pan American Games medalists in judo
Central American and Caribbean Games gold medalists for Cuba
Competitors at the 2006 Central American and Caribbean Games
Central American and Caribbean Games medalists in judo
Medalists at the 2003 Pan American Games
Medalists at the 2007 Pan American Games
Medalists at the 2011 Pan American Games
20th-century Cuban people
21st-century Cuban people